Egegik (Igyagiiq in Yup'ik) may also refer to:
Egegik, Alaska, a city in Lake and Peninsula Borough, Alaska.
Egegik Airport, a city owned, public use airport serving Egegik city.
Egegik Bay, a bay in Bristol Bay, Alaska
Egegik River, a river in Alaska.
Egegik Yupik, one of the five Central Alaskan Yup'ik dialects